Sabak Bernam District Council (Jawi: مجليس دايره سابق برنم) is the local authority which administers Sabak Bernam District. This agency is under the purview of Selangor state government. Following the upgradation of Hulu Selangor District Council as the Hulu Selangor Municipal Council on 21 October 2021, it became the state's sole district council.

Presidents

Administrative and management system
Human Resource Management and Administration Division
Public Relations Division
Legal and Enforcement Division
Finance and Revenue Division
Valuation and Investment Division
Engineering Division
Building Control Division
Environmental Health Division
Hawkers Licensing and Management Division
Town Planning and Landscape Division
Information Technology Division
One Stop Centre Unit (OSC))
Fast Action Unit (UTC)
Electrical Unit
Maintenance Unit
Logistics Unit

Councilors
2020–2022 Session

Legislation

Acts
Akta Kerajaan Tempatan 1976 (Akta 171)
Akta Jalan Parit & Bangunan 1974 (Akta 133)
Akta Perancangan Bandar & Desa 1976 (Akta 172)
Akta Bangunan dan Harta Bersama (Penyenggaraan dan Pengurusan) 2007 (Akta 663)
Akta Hakmilik Strata 1985 (Akta 318)

Bylaws
Undang-Undang Kecil Penjaja (MDSB) 2007
Undang-Undang Kecil Pemungutan, Pembuangan dan Pelupusan Sampah Sarap (MDSB) 2007
Undang-Undang Kecil Pelesenan, Tred Perniagaan dan Perindustrian (MDSB) 2007
Undang-Undang Kecil Iklan (MDSB) 2007
Undang-Undang Kecil Iklan Pilihanraya (MDSB) 2007
Undang-Undang Kecil Kerja Tanah (MDSB) 2007
Undang-Undang Kecil Pelesenan Tempat Letak Kereta Persendirian (MDSB) 2005
Undang-Undang Kecil Pelesenan Anjing dan Rumah Pembiakan Anjing (MDSB) 2007
Undang-Undang Kecil Tandas Awam (MDSB) 2005
Undang-Undang Kecil Vandalisme (MDSB) 2005
Undang-Undang Kecil Taman (MDSB) 2005
Undang-Undang Kecil Tanah Perkuburan Islam (MDSB) 2005
Undang-Undang Kecil Pasar (MDSB) 2007
Undang-Undang Kecil Pelesenan Establisymen Makanan (MDSB) 2007
Undang-Undang Kecil Pengendali Makanan (MDSB) 2007
Undang-Undang Kecil Hotel (MDSB) 2007
Undang-Undang Kecil Kolam Renang (MDSB) 2007
Undang-Undang Kecil Pusat Kecantikan dan Penjagaan Kesihatan (MDSB) 2007
Undang-Undang Kecil Pusat Sukan Persendirian (MDSB) 2007
Undang-Undang Kecil Siber dan Kafe Siber (MDSB) 2007
Undang-Undang Kecil Krematorium (MDSB) 2007
Undang-Undang Kecil (Mengkompaun Kesalahan-Kesalahan) (MDSB) Jalan Parit & Bangunan 2005
Undang-Undang Kecil (Mengkompaun Kesalahan-Kesalahan) (MDSB) Kerajaan Tempatan 2005
Undang-Undang Kecil Bangunan Seragam Selangor 1986

Encantments
Kaedah-kaedah Pekerja Kelakuan & Tatatertib (Majlis Daerah Sabak Bernam) 1995
Perintah Tetap (Mesyuarat) MDSB 2007
Perintah Pengangkutan Jalan (Peruntukkan Tempat Letak Kereta) MDSB 2007

Zone

References

District councils in Malaysia
Local government in Selangor